Raymond Wladichuk (born November 7, 1987) is a former professional Canadian football defensive back. He most recently played for the Hamilton Tiger-Cats of the Canadian Football League. He was drafted by the Tiger-Cats in the 2009 CFL Draft with the 38th pick in the fifth round, but returned to play with the Simon Fraser Clan after attending Hamilton's 2009 training camp.

External links
Hamilton Tiger-Cats bio

1987 births
Living people
Sportspeople from Vernon, British Columbia
Canadian football defensive backs
Simon Fraser Clan football players
Hamilton Tiger-Cats players
Players of Canadian football from British Columbia